Dzmitry Vasilevich Rawneyka (born 13 May 1980) is a former Belarusian professional footballer. He is currently a part of the coaching staff of Belarus.

Career
Born in Grodno, Rawneyka began playing football in FC Neman Grodno's youth system. He joined the senior side and made his Belarusian Premier League debut in 1998. He had a spell in the Russian Premier League with FC Torpedo Moscow and FC Rotor Volgograd but has spent most of his playing career with Neman Grodno.

International
Rawneyka has made eight appearances for the Belarus national football team.

References

External links 
 
 

1980 births
Sportspeople from Grodno
Living people
Belarusian expatriate footballers
Expatriate footballers in Russia
Belarusian footballers
Belarus international footballers
FC Torpedo Moscow players
Russian Premier League players
FC Rotor Volgograd players
FC Neman Grodno players
FC Dnepr Mogilev players
FC Shakhtyor Soligorsk players
Association football defenders